Osborne is an unincorporated community in Clayton County, Iowa, United States.

History
Osborne was established in 1879 and was named after its founders, Thomas and Elizabeth Osborne. 

Osbourne's population was 56 in 1902, and 59 in 1925.

References

Unincorporated communities in Clayton County, Iowa
Unincorporated communities in Iowa
1879 establishments in Iowa
Populated places established in 1879